Solange Lusiku Nsimire (1972 – October 14, 2018) was a journalist and women's rights activist from the Democratic Republic of the Congo. She was the first woman to run a written newspaper in South Kivu Province in the east of the Democratic Republic of the Congo. 

Nsimire started editing Le Souverain, an independent newspaper based in Bukavu, in 2007. She managed to resuscitate the newspaper from a moribund state, but faced repeated threats for her journalistic activity. In 2008 her home was attacked three times,  and on one occasion armed men tied up her husband and children and stole the family savings.

In 2014 Nsimire won a Courage in Journalism Award from the International Women's Media Foundation.

Nsimire died in Kinshasa on October 14, 2018.

References

1972 births
2018 deaths
Democratic Republic of the Congo journalists
Democratic Republic of the Congo women journalists
Democratic Republic of the Congo women writers
Democratic Republic of the Congo women activists
Democratic Republic of the Congo feminists